No. 157 Squadron RAF was a Royal Air Force Squadron active as a night fighter unit in the Second World War.

History

Formation and First World War
No. 157 Squadron Royal Air Force formed on 14 July 1918 at RAF Upper Heyford and was eventually equipped with Sopwith TF.2 Salamander aircraft for ground support duties, but disbanded on 1 February 1919 without becoming operational.

Reformation in Second World War
The squadron reformed in December 1941 at RAF Debden as a night fighter unit and was eventually equipped with the latest Mosquito night-fighter aircraft at RAF Castle Camps. The squadron flew patrols over East Anglia and by July 1943, after moving to RAF Hunsdon, began intruder attacks on German fighter bases with its new Mosquito Mk VIs. In November 1943, it moved to RAF Predannack in Cornwall, closer to the German bases. In March 194, it moved to RAF Valley and flew defensive patrols over the Irish Sea. In May 1944, it moved back to East Anglia, receiving Mosquito Mk XIXs and supporting bomber streams as part of No. 100 Group RAF. It disbanded on 16 August 1945 at RAF Swannington.

Aircraft operated

Squadron bases

Commanding officers

References

Notes

Bibliography

 Bowyer, Chaz. Mosquito Squadrons of the Royal Air Force. Shepperton, Surrey: Ian Allan Ltd., 1984. .
 Bowyer, Michael J.F. and John D.R. Rawlings. Squadron Codes, 1937-56. Cambridge, UK: Patrick Stephens Ltd., 1979. .
 Flintham, Vic and Andrew Thomas. Combat Codes: A full explanation and listing of British, Commonwealth and Allied air force unit codes since 1938. Shrewsbury, Shropshire, UK: Airlife Publishing Ltd., 2003. .
 Halley, James J. The Squadrons of the Royal Air Force & Commonwealth, 1918-88. Tonbridge, Kent, UK: Air-Britain (Historians) Ltd., 1988. .
 Jefford, C.G. RAF Squadrons, a Comprehensive Record of the Movement and Equipment of all RAF Squadrons and their Antecedents since 1912. Shrewsbury, Shropshire, UK: Airlife Publishing, 2001. .
 Rawlings, John D.R. Fighter Squadrons of the RAF and their Aircraft. London: Macdonald and Jane's (Publishers) Ltd., 2nd edition 1976 (reprinted 1978). .

External links

 History of No.'s 156–160 Squadrons at RAF Web
 157 Squadron history on the official RAF website

157
Military units and formations established in 1918
1918 establishments in the United Kingdom